Andreaea lorentziana is a species of moss in the family Andreaeaceae that was first described by Von Carl Müller in 1879. A. lorentziana grows in Antarctica and Patagonia.

References 

Andreaeaceae
Flora of Antarctica